Free Money Day is an annual global event held since 2011 as a social experiment and to promote sharing and alternative economic ideas.

Overview 
The day is held annually on September 15, the anniversary of the Lehman Brothers' 2008 filing for bankruptcy. Participants offer their own money to passing strangers at public places, two coins or notes at a time. Recipients are asked to pass on one of the notes or coins to someone else. Participants can also leave money with a note at a public place where it is likely to be found by another person, or to share money digitally. Since 2020, these latter options have been encouraged in populations under COVID-19 pandemic restrictions that limit in-person interactions.

Past events 

The total of 324 events at 218 different locations in 35 countries were held since 2011 according to the official website. A total amount of US$11,476 was shared on the previous Free Money Day events. Over the years, people invented their own methods to give away money. Coffee shop and video rental owners did not charge people for their services and asked them to give the amount to a stranger. In one case a person left a £10 note on a toilet seat and tweeted that "it would be the happiest bathroom visit someone will ever have".

Rationale 
Free Money Day tries to raise awareness and start conversations about the benefits of economies based on sharing, as well as inspire more critical and creative thinking about people's relationships with money and about new types of economic activities. The event is designed to help people connect with the complex issue of monetary circulation in a simple way, and inspire them to take action. It is a gateway to thinking about wider issues, including credit unions, for-profit banking, debt forgiveness, and universal basic income. The money is given without obligation; it is hoped that the event and the transactions will stimulate conversations about the role of money in society.  “This event is about much more than money. It is about co-creating the futures we truly desire by building on what we know works: sharing,” said Free Money Day global coordinator, Donnie Maclurcan, a co-founder of the Post Growth Institute.

See also 

 Feed the Deed
 GiveDirectly
 Heterodox economics
 Mitzvah
 Post-growth
 Random Acts of Kindness Day
 Room for more funding

References

External links
 Official site
 Free money, September 16, 2011, 4BC radio interview (audio),  Brisbane, Australia.
 Sharing Is Common Cents: The Free Money Day Experience, February 28, 2012, Shareable 
 Internationaler Tag des Geldverschenkens, September 27, 2011 Oya online magazine, Germany, (German language)
 Compartilhando dinheiro, September 14, 2012, Página 22 (Portuguese language)

September observances
Economics of sustainability
Social economy